The Gatineau Olympiques are a major junior ice hockey team based in Gatineau, Quebec, Canada, that plays in the Quebec Major Junior Hockey League (QMJHL). Starting with the 2021–22 season, the Olympiques play home games at Centre Slush Puppie, having previously played at the Robert Guertin Centre dating back to its beginnings in the Central Junior A Hockey League. The club, then known as the Hull Festivals, was granted membership in the QMJHL in 1973. The Olympiques have appeared in the Memorial Cup seven times, winning once in 1997. Over eighty former players and coaches have gone on to play or coach in the National Hockey League (NHL), including Martin Biron, Aleš Hemský, Jean-Gabriel Pageau, Luc Robitaille, Jeremy Roenick, Michael Ryder, Maxime Talbot, José Théodore, Colin White, Claude Giroux, David Krejčí, Jack Adams-winning head coaches Alain Vigneault and Pat Burns, and 2011 Stanley Cup-winning coach Claude Julien.

History

Before joining the QMJHL, the team was a member of the Central Junior A Hockey League, known originally as the Hull Blackhawks (Les Éperviers de Hull) but later as the Hull Beavers (Les Castors de Hull) and Hull-Volant Junior A. Originally Hull and the CJHL were eligible to compete for the Memorial Cup, the Major Junior crown, but were relegated to Tier II Junior "A" in 1970. The season before joining the QMJHL in 1973 they became the Hull Festivals, and in 1976, they became the Hull Olympiques; the team name was changed to the Gatineau Olympiques one year after the city of Hull was amalgamated into Gatineau in 2002.

The Olympiques share a junior hockey market with the Ottawa 67's, across the Ottawa River. Pre-season games between the two teams were a regular occurrence from 1975 to 1986. The teams have played interleague regular-season home and home games in the 1999–2000, 2000–01, 2001–02, 2002–03 and 2009–10 seasons since.

The Olympiques have won the President's Cup seven times, most recently in 2007–08. The team has been to four Memorial Cup finals, losing three (1986, 2003 and 2004) and winning the 1997 Memorial Cup, which they also hosted.

From 1985 until 1992, the Olympiques were owned by Wayne Gretzky; it was under his ownership that the team first adopted black, silver and white as their team colours, similar to those of  the Los Angeles Kings, whom Gretzky played for in 1988.

On May 31, 2010, it was announced that former Olympiques coach Benoit Groulx, who had left the organization to coach the Rochester Americans would be returning to be the general manager and head coach.

For the 2011–12 season, the Olympiques returned to the colours of black, silver and white following an eight-year absence.

In 2016, coach Groulx left the Olympiques again to become the head coach of the Syracuse Crunch. He was replaced by Mario Duhamel who would only coach 47 games with a 19–24–4 record. Duhamel was replaced by assistant coach Éric Landry.

Championships

Memorial Cup Canadian Hockey League champions
 1986 – Finalist vs. Guelph Platers
 1988 – 3rd place in tournament
 1995 – 4th place in tournament
 1997 – Champions vs. Lethbridge Hurricanes
 2003 – Finalist vs. Kitchener Rangers
 2004 – Finalist vs. Kelowna Rockets
 2008 – 4th place in tournament

President's Cup – League playoff champions
 1985–86 – Champions vs. Drummondville Voltigeurs
 1987–88 – Champions vs. Drummondville Voltigeurs
 1994–95 – Champions vs. Laval Titan Collège Français
 1996–97 – Champions vs. Chicoutimi Saguenéens
 1998–99 – Finalist vs. Acadie-Bathurst Titan
 1999–00 – Finalist vs. Rimouski Océanic
 2002–03 – Champions vs. Halifax Mooseheads
 2003–04 – Champions vs. Moncton Wildcats
 2007–08 – Champions vs. Rouyn-Noranda Huskies
 2010–11 – Finalist vs. Saint John Sea Dogs

Jean Rougeau Trophy – Regular season champions
 1985–86, 1987–88, 1996–97, 2003–04

Division titles – Regular season champions
 1985–86, 1987–88, 1996–97, 1999–2000, 2001–02, 2003–04, 2008–09, 2021–22

Coaches
Notable coaches for the Olympiques include, Jean Bégin, Pat Burns, John Chabot, Benoit Groulx, Claude Julien, Bob Mongrain, Marcel Pronovost, Guy Trottier, and Alain Vigneault.

Season-by-season record
 Hull Hawks (1969–1970)
 Hull Festivals (1970–1976)
 Hull Olympiques (1976–2003)
 Gatineau Olympiques (2003–present)

Regular season
Complete results before 1969 unavailable.
OL = Overtime loss, SL = Shootout loss, Pct = Winning percentage

NHL alumni
Lists of National Hockey League alumni. No player from the "Hull Hawks" went on the play in the NHL.

Hull Castors (1968–1969) 
 Billy Smith

Hull Festivals (1970–1976)

 Ted Bulley
 Nelson Burton
 Richard David
 André Doré
 Pierre Giroux
 Glen Sharpley
 Brent Tremblay

Hull Olympiques (1976–2003)

Jeff Allan
Joel Baillargeon
Yves Beaudoin
Francis Bélanger
Martin Biron
Michel Bolduc
Sébastien Bordeleau
Martin Brochu
Paul Brousseau
Benoît Brunet
Jim Campbell
John Chabot
Stéphane Charbonneau
Sylvain Côté
Jonathan Delisle
Matthieu Descoteaux
André Doré
Christian Dubé
Gordie Dwyer
Karl Dykhuis
Jiri Fischer
Steven Fletcher
Michel Galarneau
Jean-Marc Gaulin
Jocelyn Gauvreau
Martin Gélinas
Martin Gendron
Rick Hayward
Ales Hemsky
Jean-François Labbé
Marc LaBelle
Mario Larocque
Eric Lavigne
John LeBlanc
Shane MacEachern
Don MacLean
Paul MacLean
Craig Martin
Stéphane Matteau
Andrew McKim
Jan Nemecek
Lee Norwood
Jason Pominville
Stéphane Quintal
André Racicot
Peter Ratchuk
Alain Raymond
Stéphane Richer
Serge Roberge
Luc Robitaille
Jeremy Roenick
Roberto Romano
Pavel Rosa
Jean-Marc Routhier
Cam Russell
Michael Ryder
Philippe Sauvé
Daniel Shank
Martin Simard
Maxime Talbot
José Théodore
Pascal Trepanier
Jean-Guy Trudel
Sylvain Turgeon
Alain Vigneault
Radim Vrbata
Colin White
Peter Worrell

Gatineau Olympiques (since 2003)

 Claude Giroux
 Jean-Gabriel Pageau
 David Krejci
 Philippe Dupuis
 Doug O'Brien
 Francis Wathier
 Maxime Talbot
 Joel Rechlicz
 Paul Byron
 Mike Hoffman
 Tye McGinn

Retired numbers

Ten Olympiques players have had their numbers retired by the team. Former coach Pat Burns has also been honoured.

 # 10 Jean Poulin
 # 15 Luc Robitaille
 # 16 Sam Lang
 # 20 Martin Gelinas
 # 24 Colin White
 # 25 Maxime Talbot
 # 28 Claude Giroux
 # 32 Marc Saumier
 # 33 José Théodore
 # 77 Guy Rouleau

References

External links
Official web site (English version)

1969 establishments in Quebec
Ice hockey clubs established in 1969
Ice hockey in Gatineau
Ice hockey teams in Quebec
Quebec Major Junior Hockey League teams